Dobrava pri Stični is a settlement northeast of Stična in the Municipality of Ivančna Gorica in central Slovenia. The area is part of the historical region of Lower Carniola. The municipality is now included in the Central Slovenia Statistical Region.

Name
The name of the settlement was changed from Dobrava to Dobrava pri Stični in 1955.

Cultural heritage
A small roadside chapel south of the settlement is dedicated to the Virgin Mary and was built in the early 20th century.

References

External links

Dobrava pri Stični on Geopedia

Populated places in the Municipality of Ivančna Gorica